South Bank UTC is a University Technical College in Brixton, south London, England. The college opened in September 2016 and has capacity for 600 pupils.

Sponsorship and specialisms 
The UTC is sponsored by London South Bank University, Guy's and St Thomas' NHS Foundation Trust, King's College Hospital NHS Foundation Trust, Skanska. UTCs are specialist 14-19 state-funded schools led by universities and industry sponsors. In line with other UTCs across the country, South Bank has a specialism aligned to a skills gap in the local economy. In this case with an engineering and health focus, sectors struggling to recruit sufficient staff in London with the required skills and experience.

Intake 

As a University Technical College, South Bank UTC is open to students from 14 to 19 years of age, with admissions into Years 10 and 12 each academic year. As a sub-regional school, rather than a local authority provision, the UTC draws its applicants from a wide catchment ranging across London borough boundaries.

The UTC has a maximum capacity of 150 students in each year 12 and 13 and 60 students in Year 10 and 11, growing to a full capacity of 450. There are no entry requirements for admission into Year 10: the UTC is non-selective and aims to be fully inclusive while recognising its status as a non-traditional, small school. For the 6th form, applicants for level 3 courses must secure at least five GCSEs at 5+ grade including both English and Maths and grade 6 in any a-level subject to be studied; for level 2 courses, the requirement is four GCSEs in any subject and with any grade (U–A*).

Governance and standards
South Bank UTC is an academy, and is part of the South Bank Academies Trust, itself part of the LSBU Group. It has a sister school in Walworth, University Academy of Engineering South Bank. The UTC has a local governing body reporting to a board of trustees.

A 2019 Ofsted report found that the UTC "requires improvement".

Location 

South Bank UTC is based in Brixton at 52 Brixton Hill, London SW2 1QS. The building it occupies is shared with Lambeth College's Brixton site for adult education, and Trinity Academy, a secondary school.

Years 10 and 11 

Year 10 students will study a technical curriculum based around a core of GCSE with a small range of options
 GCSEs in English language and literature
 GCSEs in science
 GCSE maths
 BTEC Level 2 engineering 
or
 BTEC Level 2 Health Care
 GCSE Computer Science
or
 GCSE Design Technology
 GCSE Business Studies
or
 GCSE Geography
 Non-examined physical education, Make and Create and Personal Development, comprising PSHE, SMSC, religious studies, sex and relationships education and careers information, advice and guidance
To supplement the core curriculum, all students will work through projects, co-designed and co-delivered with university and employer partners. Some projects announced to date include:
 Skanska project in partnership with Great Ormond Street Hospital: design the hospital ward of the future using 3D CAD modelling
 King's College NHS Trust project: design and build a customised wheelchair to meet a specified patient's needs
 London South Bank University project: design and engineer an app to monitor and improve an aspect of health
 Bamboo Bicycle Club project: design and build a sustainable BMX with a bamboo frame

Years 12 and 13 

The Year 12 curriculum is built around A levels and BTEC engineering qualifications, with the following subjects on offer initially:
 A level maths
 A level physics
 A level chemistry
 A level biology
 A level computer science
 A level English
 A level Business Studies
 BTEC level 3 Diploma in engineering
with 
BTEC Extend Cert in Business Studies

 BTEC level 3 Extended Diploma in Health
 BTEC level 3 Health and Social Care

This taught curriculum is supplemented by university and employer projects, including masterclasses, 'expert witness' sessions, site visits, work experience and internships.

Partners 

 Fujitsu
 Skanska
 Guys and St Thomas NHS trust
 Kings College NHS trust

Pathways 

Students have a number of pathways open to them on leaving the UTC. These include progression to university, into employment or into higher level apprenticeships, often with sponsors and partner organisations.

References

2016 establishments in England
Educational institutions established in 2016
University Technical Colleges in London
Secondary schools in the London Borough of Lambeth
London South Bank University